Plutonium (IV) nitrate is an inorganic compound, a salt of plutonium and nitric acid with the chemical formula Pu(NO3)4. The compound dissolves in water and forms crystalline hydrates as dark green crystals.

Synthesis
Crystals of dark green to black-green composition Pu(NO3)4•5H2O precipitate with a slow (months) evaporation of a solution of a plutonium (IV) compound in nitric acid.

Physical properties
Plutonium (IV) nitrate forms a crystalline hydrate of the composition Pu(NO3)4•5H2O—dark green crystals of rhombic crystal structure, space group F dd2, cell parameters: a = 1.114 nm, b = 2.258 nm, c = 1.051 nm, Z = 8.

Crystalline hydrate melts in its own crystallization water at 95–100 °C.

It dissolves well in nitric acid (dark green solution) and water (brown solution). Also dissolves in acetone and ether.

Chemical properties
When heated to 150–180 °C, it decomposes with autooxidation to plutonium (VI) with the formation of plutonyl nitrate (PuO2(NO3)2).
Upon evaporation of concentrated nitric acid solutions of plutonium nitrate and alkali metal nitrates, double nitrates of the composition Me2[Pu(NO3)6] are formed, where Me = Cs+, Rb+, K+, Tl+, NH4+, analogous to ceric ammonium nitrate.

Toxicity
Plutonium nitrate is both radioactive and extremely toxic due to its high solubility in water.

References

Plutonium compounds
Nitrates